Midway's Greatest Arcade Hits is an arcade game compilation released for the Nintendo 64, Dreamcast, and Game Boy Advance.

Volumes and Games included 
Two volumes were released.

Volume 1 
The first volume was released for the Nintendo 64,<ref name="N64">{{cite web|url=http://www.thefreelibrary.com/``Midway's+Greatest+Arcade+Hits+Volume+I+Brings+Home+Arcade...-a066916343|archiveurl=https://web.archive.org/web/20160401131925/http://www.thefreelibrary.com/%60%60Midway%27s+Greatest+Arcade+Hits+Volume+I%27%27+Brings+Home+Arcade...-a066916343|title=Midway's Greatest Arcade Hits Volume I Brings Home Arcade Classics for Nintendo 64.|website=Business Wire|publisher=Berkshire Hathaway|archivedate=April 1, 2016|date=November 14, 2000|accessdate=August 7, 2019|via=The Free Dictionary}}</ref> Dreamcast, and Game Boy Advance.
All versions include the following games:
 Defender Sinistar Robotron: 2084 JoustThe Nintendo 64 version included two exclusive games:
 Spy Hunter Root Beer TapperThe Dreamcast versions included two other exclusive games:
 Defender II BubblesThe Game Boy Advance version has none of these four exclusive titles.

 Volume 2 
The second volume was only released on Dreamcast and features the following titles:
 Moon Patrol Paperboy 720° Spy Hunter Rampage GauntletA third volume was planned for release on Dreamcast, but was later cancelled.

 Version differences 

 Sinistar Sinistar was altered from its original arcade form for the GBA version. The antagonist's eyes no longer glow and his mouth never moves during gameplay. He only says "I am Sinistar!" at the title screen. Occasionally during gameplay, he will say "Run! Run! Run!" Upon receiving a game over, he will say "Beware! I live!" Otherwise, he says nothing.

 Reception 

All versions of the compilation received generally mixed to negative reviews, with a 64.00% of the first volume of the Dreamcast version, a 70.00% of the second volume of the Dreamcast version, a 63.43% of the Nintendo 64 version, and a 54.50% of the Game Boy Advance version from video game aggregator GameRankings.
The first volume of the Dreamcast version, the Game Boy Advance version, and the Nintendo 64 was criticized for poor sound and visual emulation, especially the Game Boy Advance version, which has been developed by Pocket Games, rather than Digital Eclipse (the developer for the console titles), which has missing voice samples and "shrunk" visuals in Sinistar, glitchy collision detection in Joust and intense slowdown in Defender''.

References

2000 video games
Dreamcast games
Game Boy Advance games
Nintendo 64 games
Midway video game compilations
Video games developed in the United States
Digital Eclipse games